A Broke Moon Rises is a studio album by American musician David Pajo, under his pseudonym Papa M. It was released August 17, 2018 under Drag City.

Critical reception
A Broke Moon Rises was met with "generally favorable" reviews from critics. At Metacritic, which assigns a weighted average rating out of 100 to reviews from mainstream publications, this release received an average score of 74, based on 7 reviews.

Track listing

References

2018 albums
David Pajo albums
Drag City (record label) albums